Diana Landi (born 11 April 1986) is an Ecuadorian long-distance runner.

In 2017, she competed in the senior women's race at the 2017 IAAF World Cross Country Championships held in Kampala, Uganda. She finished in 52nd place.

In 2018, she competed in the women's half marathon at the 2018 IAAF World Half Marathon Championships held in Valencia, Spain. She finished in 100th place.

In 2019, she competed in the women's 10,000 metres at the 2019 Pan American Games held in Lima, Peru. She finished in 11th place.

References

External links 
 

Living people
1986 births
Place of birth missing (living people)
Ecuadorian female cross country runners
Ecuadorian female long-distance runners
Ecuadorian female marathon runners
Athletes (track and field) at the 2019 Pan American Games
Pan American Games competitors for Ecuador
21st-century Ecuadorian women